Borassus aethiopum is a species of Borassus palm from Africa. In English it is variously referred to as African fan palm, African palmyra palm, deleb palm, ron palm, toddy palm, black rhun palm, rônier palm (from the French). It is widespread across much of tropical Africa from Senegal to Ethiopia and south to northern South Africa, though it is largely absent from the forested areas of Central Africa and desert regions such as the Sahara and Namib. This palm also grows in northwest Madagascar and the Comoros.

Description
Each fruit contains 1-3 seeds, each enclosed within a woody endocarp. The floodplains variety is almost certainly the most massive of all palms.

Uses
The tree has many uses: the fruit are edible, as are the tender roots produced by the young plant; fibres can be obtained from the leaves; and the wood (which is reputed to be termite-proof) can be used in construction.

See also
Great Mosque of Djenné (example of use of wood in construction)

References

External links

Horticopia page on B. aethiopium
PACSOF page on B. aethiopium
La Plant Encyclo page on B. aethiopum (in French)
Multilingual Multiscript Plant Name Database page on Borassus

Fruits originating in Africa
aethiopicum
Trees of Africa
Flora of Madagascar
Flora of the Comoros
Plants described in 1838